French football club SC Bastia's 1993–94 season. Finished 3rd place in league and promoted to first league, and Was eliminated to Coupe de France end of 32. Top scorer of the season, including 9 goals in 6 league matches have been Pascal Camadini.

Transfers

In 
Summer
 Laurent Castro from Montpellier (loan)
 Jean-Luc Bernard from Baume les Dames
 Jacky Canosi from Nancy
 Aziz El Ouali & Gilles Leclerc from Nîmes
 Bruno Lippini from CA Bastia Gallia Lucciana
 Michel Padovani from AS Saint-Seurin
 Éric Mura from Strasbourg
 Bruno Rodriguez from Monaco
 Cyril Rool from Aix-en-Provence

Winter
 No.

Out 
Summer
 Morlaye Soumah to Valenciennes (loan)
 Antoine Di Fraya & Yves Mangione to Valenciennes
 Thierry Taberner to FC Gaillard
 Ismaël Triki to Châteauroux
 Olivier Anziani retired

Winter
 No.

Squad

French Division 2

League table

Results summary

Results by round

Matches

Coupe de France

Top scorers

References 

SC Bastia seasons
Bastia